Karissa Whitsell (born June 15, 1981) is an accomplished American blind cyclist. Whitsell, with her tandem partner Katie Compton, won four medals at the 2004 ΧΙΙ Paralympic Games in Athens, Greece. They won a gold medal in the road race/time trial event, another gold in the 3 km individual pursuit, a silver in the 1 km time trial, and a bronze in the sprint.

Whitsell won a gold medal in the time trial, a silver medal in the road race, and a bronze medal in the individual pursuit event in the 2008 Summer Paralympics in Beijing.

References

External links
 
 
 
 
 

1981 births
Living people
American female cyclists
American blind people
Cyclists at the 2004 Summer Paralympics
Paralympic cyclists of the United States
Paralympic gold medalists for the United States
Paralympic silver medalists for the United States
Paralympic bronze medalists for the United States
Cyclists at the 2008 Summer Paralympics
Place of birth missing (living people)
Medalists at the 2004 Summer Paralympics
Medalists at the 2008 Summer Paralympics
Paralympic medalists in cycling
Medalists at the 2011 Parapan American Games
21st-century American women